Ryland is an unincorporated community in eastern Madison County, Alabama. The community borders Maysville.

History
Ryland is named after the first postmaster, Virgil Homer Ryland. A post office was established under the name Ryland in 1895.

References

External links

Unincorporated communities in Alabama
Unincorporated communities in Madison County, Alabama
Huntsville-Decatur, AL Combined Statistical Area